Attitudes toward lesbian, gay, bisexual, and transgender (LGBT) people and their experiences in the Muslim world have been influenced by its religious, legal, social, political, and cultural history. The Quran narrates the story of the "people of Lot" destroyed by the wrath of God because the men engaged in lustful carnal acts between themselves, but modern Western historians have concluded that the Islamic prophet Muhammad never forbade homosexual relationships outright, although he disapproved of them in line with his contemporaries. At the same time, "both the Quran and the hadith strongly condemn homosexual activity"; with some hadith prescribing the death penalty for those engaged in male homosexual or lesbian intercourse publicly.

There is little evidence of homosexual practice in Islamic societies for the first century and a half of the early history of Islam (7th century CE), although male homosexual relationships were known and discriminated, but not sanctioned, in Arabia. Homosexual acts were legally forbidden in traditional Islamic jurisprudence and subject to punishment, including flogging, stoning, and the capital punishment, depending on the situation and legal school. At the same time, homosexual relationships were in practice generally tolerated in pre-modern Islamic societies, and historical records suggest that laws against homosexuality were invoked infrequently, and mainly in cases of rape or other "exceptionally blatant infringement on public morals". Homoerotic and pederastic themes were cultivated in poetry and other literary genres written in major languages of the Muslim world from the 8th century CE into the modern era. The conceptions of homosexuality found in classical Islamic texts resemble the traditions of Greco-Roman antiquity rather than the modern understanding of sexual orientation.

In the modern era, public attitudes toward homosexuality in the Muslim world underwent a marked change starting from the 19th century due to the global spread of Islamic fundamentalist movements such as Salafism and Wahhabism. The Muslim world was also influenced by the sexual notions and restrictive norms prevalent in Europe at the time, and today, a number of Muslim-majority countries retain the criminal penalties for homosexual acts first enacted under European colonial rule. As LGBT movements gained traction in Europe and the West, Islamic fundamentalist politicians associated Western civilisation with homosexuality and "ravaging moral decay". In contemporary society, prejudice, anti-LGBT violence and discrimination, including within law, persist in much of the Muslim world, exacerbated by socially conservative attitudes and the recent rise of Islamist movements in some countries. There are laws against homosexual sexual activities in a larger number of Muslim-majority countries, which prescribe the death penalty in a limited number of them.

Most Muslim-majority countries and the Organisation of Islamic Cooperation (OIC) have opposed moves to advance LGBT rights at the United Nations, in the General Assembly or the UNHRC. In 2008, 57 UN member nations, most of them having a Muslim majority, cosponsored a statement opposing LGBT rights at the UN General Assembly. In May 2016, a group of 51 Muslim majority states blocked 11 gay and transgender organizations from attending the 2016 High Level Meeting on Ending AIDS. There are also several organizations for LGBT Muslims which support LGBT rights, and others which attempt conversion therapy.

Scripture and Islamic jurisprudence

In the Quran

Messengers to Lot 

The Quran contains several allusions to homosexual activity, which has prompted considerable exegetical and legal commentaries over the centuries. The subject is most clearly addressed in the story of Sodom and Gomorrah (seven verses) after the men of the city demand to have sex with the (seemingly male) messengers sent by God to the prophet Lot (or Lut). The Quranic narrative largely conforms to that found in Genesis. In one passage the Quran says that the men "solicited his guests of him" (Quran 54:37), using an expression that parallels phrasing used to describe the attempted seduction of Joseph, and in multiple passages they are accused of "coming with lust" to men instead of women (or their wives). The Quran terms this lewdness or fahisha unprecedented in the history of the world:

The destruction of the "people of Lut" is thought to be explicitly associated with their sexual practices. Later exegetical literature built on these verses as writers attempted to give their own views as to what went on; and there was general agreement among exegetes that the "lewdness" alluded to by the Quranic passages was attempted sodomy (specifically anal intercourse) between men. Some Muslim academics disagree with this interpretation, arguing that the "people of Lut" were destroyed not because of participation in homosexuality, but because of misdeeds which included refusing to worship one God, disregarding and disrespecting the authority of the Prophets and messengers, and attempting to rape the travelers, despite the fact the travelers were under Lut's protection and hospitality.

The sins of the "people of Lut" subsequently became proverbial and the Arabic words for the act of anal sex between men such as liwat and for a person who performs such acts both derive from his name, although Lut was not the one demanding sex.

Some Western and Modern Islamic scholars argue that in the course of the Quranic Lot story, homosexuality in the modern sense is not addressed, but that the destruction of the "people of Lut" was a result of breaking the ancient hospitality law and sexual violence, in this case they attempted rape of men.

Zina verse 
Only one passage in the Quran prescribes a strictly legal position. It is not restricted to homosexual behaviour, however, and deals more generally with zina (illicit sexual intercourse):

In the exegetical Islamic literature, this verse has provided the basis for the view that Muhammad took a lenient approach towards male homosexual practices. The Orientalist scholar Pinhas Ben Nahum has argued that "it is obvious that the Prophet viewed the vice with philosophic indifference. Not only is the punishment not indicated—it was probably some public reproach or insult of a slight nature—but mere penitence sufficed to escape the punishment". Most exegetes hold that these verses refer to illicit heterosexual relationships, although a minority view attributed to the Mu'tazilite scholar Abu Muslim al-Isfahani interpreted them as referring to homosexual relations. This view was widely rejected by medieval scholars, but has found some acceptance in modern times.

Cupbearers in paradise 
Some Quranic verses describing the Islamic paradise refer to perpetually youthful attendants which inhabit it, and they are described as both male and female servants: the females are referred to as ḥūr, whereas the males are referred to as ghilmān, wildān, and suqāh. The slave boys are referred to in the Quran as "immortal boys" or "young men" who serve wine and meals to the blessed. Although the tafsir literature does not interpret this as a homoerotic allusion, the connection was made in other literary genres, mostly humorously. For example, the Abbasid-era poet Abu Nuwas wrote:

Jurists of the Hanafi school took up the question seriously, considering, but ultimately rejecting the suggestion that homosexual pleasures were, like wine, forbidden in this world but enjoyed in the afterlife.

In the hadith 
The hadith (sayings and actions attributed to Muhammad) show that homosexual behaviour was not unknown in seventh-century Arabia. However, given that the Quran did not specify the punishment of homosexual practices, Islamic jurists increasingly turned to several "more explicit" hadiths in an attempt to find guidance on appropriate punishment.

While there are no reports relating to homosexuality in the best known and authentic hadith collections of Sahih al-Bukhari and Sahih Muslim, other canonical collections record a number of condemnations of the "act of the people of Lut" (male-to-male anal intercourse). For example, Abu 'Isa Muhammad ibn 'Isa at-Tirmidhi (compiling the Sunan al-Tirmidhi around 884) wrote that Muhammad had indeed prescribed the death penalty for both the active and passive partners:

Ibn al-Jawzi (1114–1200), writing in the 12th century, claimed that Muhammad had cursed "sodomites" in several hadith, and had recommended the death penalty for both the active and passive partners in homosexual acts.

Al-Nuwayri (1272–1332), writing in the 13th century, reported in his Nihaya that Muhammad is "alleged to have said what he feared most for his community were the practices of the people of Lot (he seems to have expressed the same idea in regard to wine and female seduction)."

According to Oliver Leaman, Other hadiths seem to permit homoerotic feelings as long as they are not translated into action. However, In one hadith attributed to Muhammad himself, which exists in multiple variants, the Islamic prophet acknowledged homoerotic temptation towards young boys and warned his Companions against it: "Do not gaze at the beardless youths, for verily they have eyes more tempting than the houris" or "... for verily they resemble the houris". These beardless youths are also described as wearing sumptuous robes and having perfumed hair. Consequently, Islamic religious leaders, skeptical of Muslim men's capacity of self-control over their sexual urges, have forbidden looking and yearning both at males and females.

In addition, there is a number of "purported (but mutually inconsistent) reports" (athar) of punishments of sodomy ordered by some of the early caliphs. Abu Bakr apparently recommended toppling a wall on the culprit, or else burning him alive, while Ali ibn Abi Talib is said to have ordered death by stoning for one sodomite and had another thrown head-first from the top of the highest building in the town; according to Ibn Abbas, the latter punishment must be followed by stoning.

There are, however, fewer hadith mentioning homosexual behaviour in women;
but punishment (if any) for lesbianism was not clarified.

Gender-variant people

In Classical Arabic and Islamic literature, the plural term mukhannathun (singular: mukhannath) was a term used to describe gender-variant people, and it has typically referred to effeminate men or people with ambiguous sexual characteristics, who appeared feminine and functioned sexually or socially in roles typically carried out by women. According to the Iranian scholar Mehrdad Alipour, "in the premodern period, Muslim societies were aware of five manifestations of gender ambiguity: This can be seen through figures such as the khasi (eunuch), the hijra, the mukhannath, the mamsuh and the khuntha (hermaphrodite/intersex)." Gender specialists Aisya Aymanee M. Zaharin and Maria Pallotta-Chiarolli give the following explanation of the meaning of the term mukhannath and its derivate Arabic forms in the hadith literature:

Moreover, within Islam, there is a tradition of the elaboration and refinement of extended religious doctrines through scholarship. This doctrine contains a passage by the scholar and hadith collector An-Nawawi:A mukhannath is the one ("male") who carries in his movements, in his appearance and in his language the characteristics of a woman. There are two types; the first is the one in whom these characteristics are innate, he did not put them on by himself, and therein is no guilt, no blame and no shame, as long as he does not perform any (illicit) act or exploit it for money (prostitution etc.). The second type acts like a woman out of immoral purposes and he is the sinner and blameworthy.The hadith collection of Bukhari (compiled in the 9th century from earlier oral traditions) includes a report regarding mukhannathun, effeminate men who were granted access to secluded women's quarters and engaged in other non-normative gender behavior: This hadiths attributed to Muhammad's wives, a mukhannath in question expressed his appreciation of a woman's body and described it for the benefit of another man. According to one hadith, this incident was prompted by a mukhannath servant of Muhammad's wife Umm Salama commenting upon the body of a woman and following that, Muhammad cursed the mukhannathun and their female equivalents, mutarajjilat and ordered his followers to remove them from their homes.

Early Islamic literature rarely comments upon the habits of the mukhannathun. It seems there may have been some variance in how "effeminate" they were, though there are indications that some adopted aspects of feminine dress or at least ornamentation. One hadith states that a Muslim mukhannath who had dyed his hands and feet with henna (traditionally a feminine activity) was banished from Medina, but not killed for his behavior.

Other hadiths also mention the punishment of banishment, both in connection with Umm Salama's servant and a man who worked as a musician. Muhammad described the musician as a mukhannath and threatened to banish him if he did not end his unacceptable career.

According to Everett K. Rowson, professor of Middle Eastern and Islamic Studies at New York University, none of the sources state that Muhammad banished more than two mukhannathun, and it is not clear to what extent the action was taken because of their breaking of gender rules in itself or because of the "perceived damage to social institutions from their activities as matchmakers and their corresponding access to women".

Traditional Islamic jurisprudence 
The scarcity of concrete prescriptions from hadith and the contradictory nature of information about the actions of early authorities resulted in the lack of agreement among classical jurists as to how homosexual activity should be treated.
Classical Islamic jurists did not deal with homosexuality as a sexual orientation, since the latter concept is modern and has no equivalent in traditional law, which dealt with it under the technical terms of liwat and zina.

Broadly, traditional Islamic law took the view that homosexual activity could not be legally sanctioned because it takes place outside religiously-recognised marriages. All major schools of law consider liwat (anal sex) as a punishable offence. Most legal schools treat homosexual intercourse with penetration similarly to unlawful heterosexual intercourse under the rubric of zina, but there are differences of opinion with respect to methods of punishment. Some legal schools "prescribed capital punishment for sodomy, but others opted only for a relatively mild discretionary punishment." The Hanbalites are the most severe among Sunni schools, insisting on capital punishment for anal sex in all cases, while the other schools generally restrict punishment to flagellation with or without banishment, unless the culprit is muhsan (Muslim free married adult), and Hanafis often suggest no physical punishment at all, leaving the choice to the judge's discretion. The founder of the Hanafi school Abu Hanifa refused to recognize the analogy between sodomy and zina, although his two principal students disagreed with him on this point. The Hanafi scholar Abu Bakr Al-Jassas (d. 981 AD/370 AH) argued that the two hadiths on killing homosexuals "are not reliable by any means and no legal punishment can be prescribed based on them". Where capital punishment is prescribed and a particular method is recommended, the methods range from stoning (Hanbali, Maliki), to the sword (some Hanbalites and Shafi'ites), or leaving it to the court to choose between several methods, including throwing the culprit off a high building (Shi'ite).

For unclear reasons, the treatment of homosexuality in Twelver Shi'ism jurisprudence is generally harsher than in Sunni fiqh, while Zaydi and Isma'ili Shia jurists took positions similar to the Sunnis. Where flogging is prescribed, there is a tendency for indulgence and some recommend that the prescribed penalty should not be applied in full, with Ibn Hazm reducing the number of strokes to 10. There was debate as to whether the active and passive partners in anal sex should be punished equally. Beyond penetrative anal sex, there was "general agreement" that "other homosexual acts (including any between females) were lesser offenses, subject only to discretionary punishment." Some jurists viewed sexual intercourse as possible only for an individual who possesses a phallus; hence those definitions of sexual intercourse that rely on the entry of as little of the corona of the phallus into a partner's orifice. Since women do not possess a phallus and cannot have intercourse with one another, they are, in this interpretation, physically incapable of committing zinā.

Practicality
Since a hadd punishment for zina requires testimony from four witnesses of the actual act of penetration or a confession from the accused repeated four times, the legal criteria for the prescribed harsh punishments of homosexual acts were very difficult to fulfill. The debates of classical jurists are "to a large extent theoretical, since homosexual relations have always been tolerated" in pre-modern Islamic societies. While it is difficult to determine to what extent the legal sanctions were enforced in different times and places, historical record suggests that the laws were invoked mainly in cases of rape or other "exceptionally blatant infringement on public morals". Documented instances of prosecution for homosexual acts are rare, and those which followed legal procedure prescribed by Islamic law are even rarer.

Modern interpretation
In Kecia Ali's book, she cites that "contemporary scholars disagree sharply about the Qur'anic perspective on same-sex intimacy." One scholar represents the conventional perspective by arguing that the Qur'an "is very explicit in its condemnation of homosexuality leaving scarcely any loophole for a theological accommodation of homosexuality in Islam." Another scholar argues that "the Qur'an does not address homosexuality or homosexuals explicitly." Overall, Ali says that "there is no one Muslim perspective on anything."

Many Muslim scholars have followed a "don't ask, don't tell" policy in regards to homosexuality in Islam, by treating the subject with passivity.

Mohamed El-Moctar El-Shinqiti, director of the Islamic Center of South Plains in Texas, has argued that "[even though] homosexuality is a grievous sin...[a] no legal punishment is stated in the Qur'an for homosexuality...[b] it is not reported that Prophet Muhammad has punished somebody for committing homosexuality...[c] there is no authentic hadith reported from the Prophet prescribing a punishment for the homosexuals..." Classical hadith scholars such as Al-Bukhari, Yahya ibn Ma'in, Al-Nasa'i, Ibn Hazm, Al-Tirmidhi, and others have disputed the authenticity of hadith reporting these statements.

Egyptian Islamist journalist Muhammad Jalal Kishk also found no punishment for homosexual acts prescribed in the Quran, regarding the hadith that mentioned it as poorly attested. He did not approve of such acts, but believed that Muslims who abstained from sodomy would be rewarded by sex with youthful boys in paradise.

Faisal Kutty, a professor of Islamic law at Indiana-based Valparaiso University Law School and Toronto-based Osgoode Hall Law School, commented on the contemporary same-sex marriage debate in a 27 March 2014 essay in the Huffington Post.  He acknowledged that while Islamic law iterations prohibit pre- and extra-marital as well as same-sex sexual activity, it does not attempt to "regulate feelings, emotions and urges, but only its translation into action that authorities had declared unlawful". Kutty, who teaches comparative law and legal reasoning, also wrote that many Islamic scholars have "even argued that homosexual tendencies themselves were not haram [prohibited] but had to be suppressed for the public good".  He claimed that this may not be "what the LGBTQ community wants to hear", but that, "it reveals that even classical Islamic jurists struggled with this issue and had a more sophisticated attitude than many contemporary Muslims". Kutty, who in the past wrote in support of allowing Islamic principles in dispute resolution, also noted that "most Muslims have no problem extending full human rights to those—even Muslims—who live together 'in sin'".  He argued that it therefore seems hypocritical to deny fundamental rights to same-sex couples. Moreover, he concurred with Islamic legal scholar Mohamed Fadel in arguing that this is not about changing Islamic marriage (nikah), but about making "sure that all citizens have access to the same kinds of public benefits".

Islamic scholar Scott Siraj al-Haqq Kugle has argued for a different interpretation of the Lot narrative focusing not on the sexual act but on the infidelity of the tribe and their rejection of Lot's Prophethood. According to Kugle, "where the Qur'an treats same-sex acts, it condemns them only so far as they are exploitive or violent." More generally, Kugle notes that the Quran refers to four different levels of personality. One level is "genetic inheritance." The Qur'an refers to this level as one's "physical stamp" that "determines one's temperamental nature" including one's sexuality. On the basis of this reading of the Qur'an, Kugle asserts that homosexuality is "caused by divine will," so "homosexuals have no rational choice in their internal disposition to be attracted to same-sex mates."  Kugle argues that if the classical commentators had seen "sexual orientation as an integral aspect of human personality," they would have read the narrative of Lot and his tribe "as addressing male rape of men in particular" and not as "addressing homosexuality in general."  Kugle furthermore reads the Qur'an as holding "a positive assessment of diversity." Under this reading, Islam can be described as "a religion that positively assesses diversity in creation and in human societies," allowing gay and lesbian Muslims to view homosexuality as representing the "natural diversity in sexuality in human societies." A critique of Kugle's approach, interpretations and conclusions was published in 2016 by Mobeen Vaid.

In a 2012 book, Aisha Geissinger writes that there are "apparently irreconcilable Muslim standpoints on same-sex desires and acts," all of which claim "interpretative authenticity." One of these standpoints results from "queer-friendly" interpretations of the Lot story and the Quran. The Lot story is interpreted as condemning "rape and inhospitality rather than today's consensual same-sex relationships."

In their book Islamic Law and Muslim Same-Sex Unions, Junaid Jahangir and Hussein Abdullatif argue that interpretations which view the Quranic narrative of the people of Lot and the derived classical notion of liwat as applying to same-sex relationships reflect the sociocultural norms and medical knowledge of societies that produced those interpretations. They further argue that the notion of liwat is compatible with the Quranic narrative, but not with the contemporary understanding of same-sex relationships based on love and shared responsibilities.

In his 2010 article Sexuality and Islam, Abdessamad Dialmy addressed "sexual norms defined by the sacred texts (Koran and Sunna)." He wrote that "sexual standards in Islam are paradoxical." The sacred texts "allow and actually are an enticement to the exercise of sexuality."  However, they also "discriminate . . . between heterosexuality and homosexuality." Islam's paradoxical standards result in "the current back and forth swing of sexual practices between repression and openness." Dialmy sees a solution to this back and forth swing by a "reinterpretation of repressive holy texts."

History of homosexuality in Islamic societies
Societies in Islam have recognized "both erotic attraction and sexual behavior between members of the same sex". However, their attitudes about them have often been contradictory: "severe religious and legal sanctions" against homosexual behavior and at the same time "celebratory expressions" of erotic attraction. Homoeroticism was idealized in the form of poetry or artistic declarations of love from one man to another. Accordingly, the Arabic language had an appreciable vocabulary of homoerotic terms, with dozens of words just to describe types of male prostitutes. Schmitt (1992) identifies some twenty words in Arabic, Persian, and Turkish to identify those who are penetrated. Other related Arabic words includes mukhannathun, ma'bûn, halaqī, and baghghā.

Pre-modern era
There is little evidence of homosexual practice in Islamic societies for the first century and a half of the Islamic era. Homoerotic poetry appears suddenly at the end of the 8th century CE, particularly in Baghdad in the work of Abu Nuwas (756–814), who became a master of all the contemporary genres of Arabic poetry. The famous author Jahiz tried to explain the abrupt change in attitudes toward homosexuality after the Abbasid Revolution by the arrival of the Abbasid army from Khurasan, who are said to have consoled themselves with male pages when they were forbidden to take their wives with them. The increased prosperity following the early conquests was accompanied by a "corruption of morals" in the two holy cities of Mecca and Medina, and it can be inferred that homosexual practice became more widespread during this time as a result of acculturation to foreign customs, such as the music and dance practiced by mukhannathun, who were mostly foreign in origin. The Abbasid ruler Al-Amin (809–813) was said to have required slave women to be dressed in masculine clothing so he could be persuaded to have sex with them, and a broader fashion for ghulamiyyat (boy-like girls) is reflected in literature of the period. The same was said of Andalusian caliph al-Hakam II (915–976).

The conceptions of homosexuality found in classical Islamic texts resemble the traditions of classical Greece and those of ancient Rome, rather than the modern understanding of sexual orientation. It was expected that many mature men would be sexually attracted to both women and adolescent boys (with different views about the appropriate age range for the latter), and such men were expected to wish to play only an active role in homosexual intercourse once they reached adulthood. However, any confident assessment of the actual incidence of homosexual behavior remains elusive. Preference for homosexual over heterosexual relations was regarded as a matter of personal taste rather than a marker of homosexual identity in a modern sense. While playing an active role in homosexual relations carried no social stigma beyond that of licentious behavior, seeking to play a passive role was considered both unnatural and shameful for a mature man. Following Greek precedents, the Islamic medical tradition only regarded this latter case as pathological, and showed no concern for other forms of homosexual behavior.

Everett K. Rowson, professor of Middle Eastern and Islamic Studies at New York University, remarks that from a Western point of view, the conception of homosexual love in pre-modern Muslim societies cannot be considered as a relationship of reciprocal affection and mutual consent, but rather a "one-sided and asymmetrical affair" which involved older, adult men having sexual intercourse with younger, adolescent boys or children. Citing various poems as examples of this kind of relationships from Persian literature, Rowson states:

During the early period, growth of a beard was considered to be the conventional age when an adolescent lost his homoerotic appeal, as evidenced by poetic protestations that the author still found his lover beautiful despite the growing beard. During later periods, the age of the stereotypical beloved became more ambiguous, and this prototype was often represented in Persian poetry by Turkic slave-soldiers. This trend is illustrated by the story of Mahmud of Ghazni (971–1030), the ruler of the Ghaznavid Empire, and his cupbearer Malik Ayaz. Their relationship started when Malik was a slave boy: "At the time of the coins’ minting, Mahmud of Ghazni was in a passionate romantic relationship with his male slave Malik Ayaz, and had exalted him to various positions of power across the Ghazanid Empire. While the story of their love affair had been censored until recently — the result of Western colonialism and changing attitudes towards homosexuality in the Middle East — Jasmine explains how Ghazni's subjects saw their relationship as a higher form of love."

Other famous examples of homosexuality include the Aghlabid Emir Ibrahim II of Ifriqiya (ruled 875–902), who was said to have been surrounded by some sixty catamites, yet whom he was said to have treated in a most horrific manner. Caliph al-Mutasim in the 9th century and some of his successors were accused of homosexuality. The Christian martyr Pelagius of Córdoba was executed by Andalusian ruler Abd al-Rahman III because the boy refused his advances.

The 14th-century Iranian poet Obeid Zakani, in his scores of satirical stories and poems, ridiculed the contradiction between the strict prohibitions of homosexuality on the one hand and its common practice on the other. Following is an example from his Ressaleh Delgosha: “Two old men, who used to exchange sex since their very childhood, were making love on the top of a mosque’s minaret in the holy city of Qom. When both finished their turns, one told the other: “shameless practices have ruined our city.” The other man nodded and said, “You and I are the city’s blessed seniors, what then do you expect from others?”

European sources state that Mehmed the Conqueror, an Ottoman sultan from the 15th century, "was known to have ambivalent sexual tastes, sent a eunuch to the house of Notaras, demanding that he supply his good-looking fourteen-year-old son for the Sultan's pleasure. When he refused, the Sultan instantly ordered the decapitation of Notaras, together with that of his son and his son-in-law; and their three heads … were placed on the banqueting table before him". Another youth Mehmed found attractive, and who was presumably more accommodating, was Radu III the Fair, the brother of Vlad the Impaler: "Radu, a hostage in Istanbul whose good looks had caught the Sultan's fancy, and who was thus singled out to serve as one of his most favored pages." After the defeat of Vlad, Mehmed placed Radu on the throne of Wallachia as a vassal ruler. However, some Turkish sources deny these stories.

According to the Encyclopedia of Islam and the Muslim World:
Whatever the legal strictures on sexual activity, the positive expression of male homoerotic sentiment in literature was accepted, and assiduously cultivated, from the late eighth century until modern times. First in Arabic, but later also in Persian, Turkish and Urdu, love poetry by men about boys more than competed with that about women, it overwhelmed it. Anecdotal literature reinforces this impression of general societal acceptance of the public celebration of male-male love (which hostile Western caricatures of Islamic societies in medieval and early modern times simply exaggerate).

European travellers remarked on the taste that Shah Abbas of Iran (1588–1629) had for wine and festivities, but also for attractive pages and cup-bearers. A painting by Riza Abbasi with homo-erotic qualities shows the ruler enjoying such delights.

According to Daniel Eisenberg, "Homosexuality was a key symbolic issue throughout the Middle Ages in [Islamic] Iberia. As was customary everywhere until the nineteenth century, homosexuality was not viewed as a congenital disposition or 'identity'; the focus was on nonprocreative sexual practices, of which sodomy was the most controversial." For example, in al-Andalus "homosexual pleasures were much indulged by the intellectual and political elite. Evidence includes the behavior of rulers . . . who kept male harems." Although early Islamic writings such as the Quran expressed a mildly negative attitude towards homosexuality, laypersons usually apprehended the idea with indifference, if not admiration. Few literary works displayed hostility towards non-heterosexuality, apart from partisan statements and debates about types of love (which also occurred in heterosexual contexts). Khaled el-Rouayheb (2014) maintains that "much if not most of the extant love poetry of the period [16th to 18th century] is pederastic in tone, portraying an adult male poet's passionate love for a teenage boy".

El-Rouayheb suggests that even though religious scholars considered sodomy as an abhorrent sin, most of them did not genuinely believe that it was illicit to merely fall in love with a boy or express this love via poetry. In secular society however, a male's desire to penetrate a desirable youth was seen as understandable, even if unlawful. On the other hand, men adopting the passive role were more subjected to stigma. The medical term ubnah qualified the pathological desire of a male to exclusively be on the receiving end of anal intercourse. Physicians that theorized on ubnah includes Rhazes, who thought that it was correlated with small genitals and that a treatment was possible provided that the subject was deemed to be not too effeminate and the behavior not "prolonged". Dawud al-Antaki advanced that it could have been caused by an acidic substance embedded in the veins of the anus, causing itchiness and thus the need to seek relief.

In mystic writings of the medieval era, such as Sufi texts, it is "unclear whether the beloved being addressed is a teenage boy or God." European chroniclers censured "the indulgent attitudes to gay sex in the Caliphs' courts." Mustafa Akyol writes that "The Ottoman sultans, arguably, were social liberals compared with the contemporary Islamists of Turkey, let alone the Arab World."

Modern era

The 18th and 19th centuries saw the rise of Islamic fundamentalism such as Wahhabism, which came to call for stricter adherence to the Hadith. In 1744, Muhammad bin Saud, the tribal ruler of the town of Diriyah, endorsed ibn Abd al-Wahhab’s mission and the two swore an oath to establish a state together run according to true Islamic principles. For the next seventy years, until the dismantlement of the first state in 1818, the Wahhabis dominated from Damascus to Baghdad. Homosexuality, which had been largely tolerated in the Ottoman Empire, also became criminalized, and those found guilty were thrown to their deaths from the top of the minarets.

Homosexuality in the Ottoman Empire was decriminalized in 1858, as part of wider reforms during the Tanzimat. However, authors Lapidus and Salaymeh write that before the 19th century Ottoman society had been open and welcoming to homosexuals, and that by the 1850s via European influence they began censoring homosexuality in their society. In Iran, several hundred political opponents were executed in the aftermath of the 1979 Islamic Revolution and justified it by accusing them of homosexuality. Homosexual intercourse became a capital offense in Iran's Islamic Penal Code in 1991. Though the grounds for execution in Iran are difficult to track, there is evidence that several people were hanged for homosexual behavior in 2005–2006 and in 2016, mostly in cases of dubious charges of rape. In some countries like Iran and Iraq the dominant discourse is that Western imperialism has spread homosexuality. In Egypt, though homosexuality is not explicitly criminalized, it has been widely prosecuted under vaguely formulated "morality" laws. Under the current rule of Abdel Fattah el-Sisi, arrests of LGBT individuals have risen fivefold, apparently reflecting an effort to appeal to conservatives. In Uzbekistan, an anti-sodomy law, passed after World War II with the goal of increasing the birth rate, was invoked in 2004 against a gay rights activist, who was imprisoned and subjected to extreme abuse. In Iraq, where homosexuality is legal, the breakdown of law and order following the Second Gulf War allowed Islamist militias and vigilantes to act on their prejudice against gays, with ISIS gaining particular notoriety for the gruesome acts of anti-LGBT violence committed under its rule of parts of Syria and Iraq. Scott Siraj al-Haqq Kugle has argued that while Muslims "commemorate the early days of Islam when they were oppressed as a marginalized few," many of them now forget their history and fail to protect "Muslims who are gay, transgender and lesbian."

According to Georg Klauda, in the 19th and early 20th century, homosexual sexual contact was viewed as relatively commonplace in parts of the Middle East, owing in part to widespread sex segregation, which made heterosexual encounters outside marriage more difficult. Klauda states that "Countless writers and artists such as André Gide, Oscar Wilde, Edward M. Forster, and Jean Genet made pilgrimages in the 19th and 20th centuries from homophobic Europe to Algeria, Morocco, Egypt, and various other Arab countries, where homosexual sex was not only met without any discrimination or subcultural ghettoization whatsoever, but rather, additionally as a result of rigid segregation of the sexes, seemed to be available on every corner." Views about homosexuality have never been universal all across the Islamic world. With reference to the Muslim world more broadly, Tilo Beckers writes that "Besides the endogenous changes in the interpretation of scriptures having a deliberalizing influence that came from within Islamic cultures, the rejection of homosexuality in Islam gained momentum through the exogenous effects of European colonialism, that is, the import of Western cultural understandings of homosexuality as a perversion." University of Münster professor Thomas Bauer points that even though there were many orders of stoning for homosexuality, there is not a single proven case of it being carried out. Bauer continues that "Although contemporary Islamist movements decry homosexuality as a form of Western decadence, the current prejudice against it among Muslim publics stems from an amalgamation of traditional Islamic legal theory with popular notions that were imported from Europe during the colonial era, when Western military and economic superiority made Western notions of sexuality particularly influential in the Muslim world."

In some Muslim-majority countries, current anti-LGBT laws were enacted by United Kingdom or Soviet organs and retained following independence. The 1860 Indian Penal Code, which included an anti-sodomy statute, was used as a basis of penal laws in other parts of the empire. However, as Dynes and Donaldson point out, North African countries under French colonial tutelage lacked anti-homosexual laws which were only born afterwards, with the full weight of Islamic opinion descending on those who, on the model of the gay liberationists of the West, would seek to make "homosexuality" (above all, adult men taking passive roles) publicly respectable. Jordan, Bahrain, and - more recently - India, a country with a substantial Muslim minority, have abolished the criminal penalties for consensual homosexual acts introduced under colonial rule. Persecution of homosexuals has been exacerbated in recent decades by a rise in Islamic fundamentalism and the emergence of the gay-rights movement in the West, which allowed Islamists to paint homosexuality as a noxious Western import.

Pederasty

While friendship between men and boys is often described in sexual ways in classical Islamic literature, Khaled El-Rouayheb and Oliver Leaman have argued that it would be misleading to conclude from this that homosexuality was widespread in practice. Such literature tended to use transgressive motifs alluding to what is forbidden, in particular homosexuality and wine. Greek homoerotic motifs may have accurately described pederastic practices in ancient Greece, but in their Islamic adaptations they tended to play a satirical or metaphorical rather than descriptive role. At the same time, many miniatures, especially from Ottoman Turkey, contain explicit depictions of pederasty, suggesting that the practice enjoyed a certain degree of popularity. A number of pre-modern texts discuss the possibility of sexual exploitation faced by young boys in educational institutions and warn teachers to take precautions against it.

In modern times, despite the formal disapproval of religious authority, the segregation of women in some Muslim societies and the strong emphasis on male virility leads some adolescent males and unmarried young men to seek sexual outlets with boys younger than themselves—in one study in Morocco, with boys in the age-range 7 to 13.

Liwat can therefore be regarded as "temptation", and anal intercourse is not seen as repulsively unnatural so much as dangerously attractive. They believe "one has to avoid getting buggered precisely in order not to acquire a taste for it and thus become addicted." Not all sodomy is homosexual: one Moroccan sociologist, in a study of sex education in his native country, states that for many young men, heterosexual sodomy is considered better than vaginal penetration, and female prostitutes likewise report the demand for anal penetration from their male clients.

In regards to homosexual intercourse, it is the enjoyment that is considered bad, rather than simply the penetration. Deep shame attaches to the passive partner. Similar sexual sociologies are reported for other Muslim societies from North Africa to Pakistan and the Far East. In 2015, The New York Times reported that U.S. soldiers serving in Afghanistan were instructed by their commanders to ignore child sexual abuse being carried out by Afghan security forces, except "when rape is being used as a weapon of war". American soldiers have been instructed not to intervene—in some cases, not even when their Afghan allies have abused boys on military bases, according to interviews and court records. But the U.S. soldiers have been increasingly troubled that instead of weeding out pedophiles, the U.S. military was arming them against the Taliban and placing them as the police commanders of villages—and doing little when they began abusing children.

Modern laws in Muslim-majority countries

Criminalization

According to the International Lesbian and Gay Association (ILGA) seven countries still retain capital punishment for homosexual behavior: Saudi Arabia, Yemen, Iran, Afghanistan, Mauritania, northern Nigeria, and the United Arab Emirates. Afghanistan also has the death penalty for homosexuality since the 2021 Taliban takeover. In Qatar, Algeria, Uzbekistan, and the Maldives, homosexuality is punished with time in prison or a fine. This has led to controversy regarding Qatar, which is due to stage the 2022 FIFA World Cup. Human rights groups have questioned the awarding in 2010 of the right to host the competition, due to the possibility that gay football fans may be jailed. In response, Sepp Blatter, head of FIFA, joked that they would have to "refrain from sexual activity" while in Qatar. He later withdrew the remarks after condemnation from rights groups.

Same-sex sexual activity is illegal in Chad since 1 August 2017 under a new penal code. Before that, homosexuality between consenting adults had not been criminalized ever prior to this law.

In Egypt, openly gay men have been prosecuted under general public morality laws. (See Cairo 52.) "Sexual relations between consenting adult persons of the same sex in private are not prohibited as such. However, the Law on the Combating of Prostitution, and the law against debauchery have been used to imprison gay men in recent years." An Egyptian TV host was recently sentenced to a year in prison for interviewing a gay man in January 2019.

The Sunni Islamist militant group and Salafi-jihadist terrorist organization ISIL/ISIS/IS/Daesh, which invaded and claimed parts of Iraq and Syria between 2014 and 2017, enacted the political and religious persecution of LGBT people and decreed capital punishment for them. ISIL/ISIS/IS/Daesh terrorists have executed more than two dozen men and women for suspected homosexual activity, including several thrown off the top of buildings in highly publicized executions.

In India, which has the third-largest Muslim population in the world, and where Islam is the largest minority religion, the largest Islamic seminary (Darul Uloom Deoband) has vehemently opposed recent government moves to abrogate and liberalize laws from the colonial era that banned homosexuality. As of September 2018, homosexuality is no longer a criminal act in India, and most of the religious groups withdrew their opposing claims against it in the Supreme Court.

In Iraq, homosexuality is allowed by the government, but terrorist groups often carry out illegal executions of gay people. Saddam Hussein was "unbothered by sexual mores." Ali Hili reports that "since the 2003 invasion more than 700 people have been killed because of their sexuality." He calls Iraq the "most dangerous place in the world for sexual minorities."

In Jordan, where homosexuality is legal, "gay hangouts have been raided or closed on bogus charges, such as serving alcohol illegally." Despite this legality, social attitudes towards homosexuality are still hostile and hateful.

In Pakistan, its law is a mixture of both British colonial law as well as Islamic law, both which proscribe criminal penalties for same-sex sexual acts. The Pakistan Penal Code of 1860, originally developed under colonial rule, punishes sodomy with a possible prison sentence and has other provisions that impact the human rights of LGBT Pakistanis, under the guise of protecting public morality and order. Yet, the more likely situation for gay and bisexual men is sporadic police blackmail, harassment, fines, and jail sentences.

In Bangladesh, homosexual acts are illegal and punishable according to section 377. Due to the traditional mentality of the predominantly conservative Bangladeshi society, negative attitudes towards those in the LGBT community are high. In 2009 and 2013, the Bangladeshi Parliament refused to overturn Section 377.

In Saudi Arabia, the maximum punishment for homosexual acts is public execution by beheading.

In Malaysia, homosexual acts are illegal and punishable with jail, fine, deportation, whipping or chemical castration. In October 2018, Prime Minister Mahathir Mohamad stated that Malaysia would not "copy" Western nations' approach towards LGBT rights, indicating that these countries were exhibiting a disregard for the institutions of the traditional family and marriage, as the value system in Malaysia is good. In May 2019, in response to the warning of George Clooney about intending to impose death penalty for homosexuals like Brunei, the Deputy Foreign Minister Marzuki Yahya pointed out that Malaysia does not kill gay people, and will not resort to killing sexual minorities. He also said, although such lifestyles deviate from Islam, the government would not impose such a punishment on the group.

In Indonesia, the country do not have a sodomy law and do not currently criminalize private, non-commercial homosexual acts among consenting adults, except in the Aceh province  where homosexuality is illegal for Muslims under Islamic Sharia law, and punishable by flogging. While not criminalising homosexuality, the country does not recognise same-sex marriage. In July 2015, the Minister of Religious Affairs stated that it is difficult in Indonesia to legalize Gay Marriage, because strongly held religious norms speak strongly against it. According to some jurists, there should be death stoning penalty for homosexuals. While another group consider flogging with 100 lashes is the correct punishment.

In Turkey, homosexuality is legal, but "official censure can be fierce". A former interior minister, İdris Naim Şahin, called homosexuality an example of "dishonour, immorality and inhuman situations". Turkey held its 16th Gay Pride Parade in Istanbul on 30 June 2019.

As the latest addition in the list of criminalizing Muslim countries, Brunei's has implemented penalty for homosexuals within Sharia Penal Code in stages since 2014. It prescribes death by stoning as punishment for sex between men, and sex between women is punishable by caning or imprisonment. The sultanate currently has a moratorium in effect on death penalty.

Death penalty

In 2020, the International Lesbian, Gay, Bisexual, Trans and Intersex Association (ILGA)  released its most recent State Sponsored Homophobia Report. The report found that eleven countries or regions impose the death penalty for "same-sex sexual acts" with reference to sharia-based laws. In Iran, according to article 129 and 131 there are up to 100 lashes of whip first three times and fourth time death penalty for lesbians. The death penalty is implemented nationwide in Brunei, Iran, Saudi Arabia, Afghanistan, Yemen, northern Nigeria, United Arab Emirates, Mauritania and Somalia. This punishment is also allowed by the law but not implemented in Qatar, and Pakistan; and was back then implemented through non-state courts by ISIS in parts of Iraq and Syria (now no longer existing).

Due to Brunei's law dictating that gay sex be punishable by stoning, many of its targeted citizens fled to Canada in hopes of finding refuge. The law is also set to impose the same punishment for adultery among heterosexual couples. Despite pushback from citizens in the LGBTQ+ community, Brunei prime minister's office produced a statement explaining Brunei's intention for carrying through with the law. It has been suggested that this is part of a plan to separate Brunei from the western world and towards a Muslim one.

In the Chechen Republic, a part of the Russian Federation, Ramzan Kadyrov has actively discriminated against homosexual individuals and presided over a campaign of arbitrary detention and extrajudicial killing.
It has been suggested that "to counteract popular support for an Islamist insurgency that erupted after the Soviet breakup, President Vladimir V. Putin of Russia has granted wide latitude to [Kadyrov] to co-opt elements of the Islamist agenda, including an intolerance of gays."
 Reports of the discrimination in Chechnya have in turn been used to stoke Islamophobia, racist, and anti-Russia rhetoric. Jessica Stern, executive director of OutRight Action International, has criticized this bigotry, noting: “Using a violent attack on men accused of being gay to legitimize islamophobia is dangerous and misleading. It negates the experiences of queer muslims and essentializes all muslims as homophobic. We cannot permit this tragedy to be co-opted by ethno-nationalists to perpetuate anti-Muslim or anti-Russian sentiment.  The people and their government are never the same.”

Minor penalty
In Algeria, Bangladesh, Chad, Morocco, Aceh, Maldives, Oman, Pakistan, Qatar, Syria, and Tunisia, it is illegal, and penalties may be imposed. In Kuwait, Turkmenistan and Uzbekistan, homosexual acts between males are illegal, but homosexual relations between females are legal.

Legalization

The Ottoman Empire (predecessor of Turkey) decriminalized homosexuality in 1858. In Turkey, where 99.8% of the population is officially registered as Muslim, homosexuality has never been criminalized since the day it was founded in 1923.

Same-sex sexual intercourse is legal in Albania, Azerbaijan, Bahrain, Bosnia and Herzegovina, Burkina Faso, Djibouti (de jure), Guinea-Bissau, Iraq (de jure), Jordan, Kazakhstan, Kosovo, Kyrgyzstan, Mali, Niger, Tajikistan, Turkey, West Bank (State of Palestine),  Indonesia, and in Northern Cyprus. In Albania and Turkey, there have been discussions about legalizing same-sex marriage. Albania, Northern Cyprus, Bosnia and Herzegovina and Kosovo also protect LGBT people with anti-discrimination laws.

Same-sex relations between females are legal in Kuwait, Turkmenistan, and Uzbekistan, but homosexual acts between males are illegal.

In Lebanon, courts have ruled that the country's penal code must not be used to target homosexuals, but the law has yet to be changed by parliament.

Same-sex marriage
In 2007, there was a gay party in the Moroccan town of al-Qasr al-Kabir. Rumours spread that this was a gay marriage and more than 600 people took to the streets, condemning the alleged event and protesting against leniency towards homosexuals. Several persons who attended the party were detained and eventually six Moroccan men were sentenced to between four and ten months in prison for "homosexuality".

In France, there was an Islamic same-sex marriage on 18 February 2012. In Paris in November 2012 a room in a Buddhist prayer hall was used by gay Muslims and called a "gay-friendly mosque", and a French Islamic website is supporting religious same-sex marriage.

The first American Muslim in the United States Congress, Keith Ellison (D-MN) said in 2010 that all discrimination against LGBT people is wrong. He further expressed support for gay marriage stating:

I believe that the right to marry someone who you please is so fundamental it should not be subject to popular approval any more than we should vote on whether blacks should be allowed to sit in the front of the bus.

In 2014, eight men were jailed for three years by a Cairo court after the circulation of a video of them allegedly taking part in a private wedding ceremony between two men on a boat on the Nile.

Transgender

In the late 1980s, Mufti Muhammad Sayyid Tantawy of Egypt issued a fatwa supporting the right for those who fit the description of mukhannathun to have sex reassignment surgery; Ayatollah Khomeini of Iran issued similar fatwas around the same time. Khomeini's initial fatwa concerned intersex individuals as well, but he later specified that sex reassignment surgery was also permissible in the case of transgender individuals. Because homosexuality is illegal in Iran but gender transition is legal, some gay individuals have been forced to undergo sex reassignment surgery and transition into the opposite sex, regardless of their actual gender identity.

While Iran has outlawed homosexuality, Iranian thinkers such as Ayatollah Khomeini have allowed for transgender people to change their sex so that they can enter heterosexual relationships. It is regarded as a cure for homosexuality, which is punishable by death under Iranian law. The government even provides up to half the cost for those needing financial assistance and a sex change is recognized on the birth certificate.

On 26 June 2016, clerics affiliated to the Pakistan-based organization Tanzeem Ittehad-i-Ummat issued a fatwa on transgender people where a trans woman (born male) with "visible signs of being a woman" is allowed to marry a man, and a trans man (born female) with "visible signs of being a man" is allowed to marry a woman. Pakistani transgender persons can also change their (legal) sex. Muslim ritual funerals also apply. Depriving transgender people of their inheritance, humiliating, insulting or teasing them were also declared haraam.

In Pakistan, transgender people make up 0.005 percent of the total population. Previously, transgender people were isolated from society and had no legal rights or protections. They also suffered discrimination in healthcare services. For example, in 2016 a transgender individual died in a hospital while doctors were trying to decide which ward the patient should be placed in. Transgender people also faced discrimination in finding employment resulting from incorrect identity cards and incongruous legal status. Many were forced into poverty, dancing, singing, and begging on the streets to scrape by. However, in May 2018, the Pakistani parliament passed a bill giving transgender individuals the right to choose their legal sex and correct their official documents, such as ID cards, driver licenses, and passports. Today, transgender people in Pakistan have the right to vote and to search for a job free from discrimination. As of 2018, one transgender woman became a news anchor, and two others were appointed to the Supreme Court.

In Lebanon, transgender women are not given any rights. Discrimination starts from their own family members when trans women are forced to leave their house. After that, trans women are not allowed to have any connections with their family members or with their neighbors. Trans women can't access educational institutions and medical services. Moreover, trans women face employment discrimination due to their wrong identity cards that are not being corrected by the government agencies. To support themselves financially, the only option often open to trans women is sex work, which is not safe for them either. Doing sex work, trans women are at higher risk of sexual abuse and violence. No laws are in existence to protect trans women. Instead, trans women are being arrested and put in jail for up to one year for having same-sex intercourse.

Although it prohibits homosexuality, Iran is the only Muslim-majority country in the Persian Gulf region that allows transgender people to express themselves by recognizing their self-identified gender and subsidizing reassignment surgery. Despite this, those who do not commit to reassignment surgery are often seen as freaks, and due to their refusal to conform they are treated as outcasts.

Public opinion among Muslims

The Muslim community as a whole, worldwide, has become polarized on the subject of homosexuality. Some Muslims say that "no good Muslim can be gay", and "traditional schools of Islamic law consider homosexuality a grave sin". At the opposite pole, "some Muslims . . . are welcoming what they see as an opening within their communities to address anti-gay attitudes." Especially, it is "young Muslims" who are "increasingly speaking out in support of gay rights".

According to the Albert Kennedy Trust, one in four young homeless people identify as LGBT due to their religious parents disowning them. The Trust suggests that the majority of individuals who are homeless due to religious out casting are either Christian or Muslim. Many young adults who come out to their parents are often forced out of the house to find refuge in a more accepting place. This leads many individual to be homeless or even attempt suicide.

Opinion polls
In 2013, the Pew Research Center conducted a study on the global acceptance of homosexuality and found a widespread rejection of homosexuality in many nations that are predominantly Muslim. In some countries, views were becoming more conservative among younger people.

2019 Arab Barometer Survey:

 A 2007 survey of British Muslims showed that 61% believe homosexuality should be illegal. A later Gallup poll in 2009 showed that none of the 500 British Muslims polled believed homosexuality to be "morally acceptable". In a 2016 ICM poll of 1,081 British Muslims, 52% of those polled disagreed with the statement 'Homosexuality should be legal in Britain' while 18% agreed. In the same poll, 56% of British Muslims polled disagreed with the statement 'Gay marriage should be legal in Britain' compared with 20% of the control group and 47% disagreed with the statement 'It is acceptable for a homosexual person to be a teacher in a school' compared with 14% of the control group.
 According to a 2012 poll, 51% of the Turks in Germany, who account for nearly two thirds of the total Muslim population in Germany, believed that homosexuality is an illness. However, a more recent poll from 2015 found that more than 60% of Muslims in Germany support gay marriage. A poll in 2017 also found 60% support for gay marriage.
 American Muslims – in line with general public attitudes in the United States – have become much more accepting of homosexuality over recent years. In a 2007 poll conducted by Pew Research Center, only 27% of American Muslims believed that homosexuality should be accepted. In a 2011 poll, that rose to 39%. In a July 2017 poll, Muslims who say homosexuality should be accepted by society clearly outnumber those who say it should be discouraged (52% versus 33%), a level of acceptance similar to American Protestants (52% in 2016). According to research by the Public Religion Research Institute's 2017 American Values Atlas, 51% of American Muslims favor same-sex marriage, while 34% are opposed.
 The 2009 Gallup poll showed that 35% of the French Muslims believed that homosexuality to be "morally acceptable".
 A 2016 iVOX survey of Belgian Muslims found that 53% agreed with the statement: "I have no issues with homosexuality." Approximately 30% disagreed with the statement while the rest refused to answer or were unsure.
 A 2016 survey of Canadian Muslims showed that 36% believes homosexuality should be generally accepted by society with up to 47% young Canadian Muslims (18–34) holding this belief.The survey also states that 43% of the Canadian Muslims disagreed with the statement homosexuality is acceptable. Muslims who opposed homosexuality are mostly older age groups 45 to 59 (55%), those with the lowest incomes (56%).
 Turkey Muslims: According to the survey conducted by the Kadir Has University in Istanbul in 2016, 33 per cent of people said that LGBT people should have equal rights. This increased to 45 per cent in 2020. Another survey by Kadir Has University in 2018 found that 55.3 percent of people wouldn't want a homosexual neighbour. This decreased to 46.5 per cent in 2019.

Muslim leaders

Sunni
 In 2017, the Egyptian cleric, Sheikh Yusuf al-Qaradawi (who has served as chairman of the European Council for Fatwa and Research) was asked how gay people should be punished. He replied that "there is disagreement," but "the important thing is to treat this act as a crime."

Shia
 Iran's current Supreme Leader, Ayatollah Ali Khamenei has stated that "There is no worst form of moral degeneration than [homosexuality]. ... But it won't stop here. In the future, not sure exactly when, they will legalize incest and even worse." According to the conservative news website Khabaronline, Mohammad Javad Larijani, Khamenei's close adviser, stated "In our society, homosexuality is regarded as an illness and malady," and that "Promoting homosexuality is illegal and we have strong laws against it." He added, "It [homosexuality] is considered as a norm in the West and they are forcing us to accept it. We are strongly against this."
 Ayatollah Ali al-Sistani in Iraq has stated "It is not permissible for a man to look at another man with lust; similarly, it is not permissible for a woman to look at another woman with lust. Homosexuality (Ash-shudhûdh al-jinsi) is harãm. Similarly, it is forbidden for a female to engage in a sexual act with another female, i.e. lesbianism."

LGBT-related movements within Islam

Conservative movements

Ex-gay organizations
There are a number of Islamic ex-gay organizations, that is, those composed of people claiming to have experienced a basic change in sexual orientation from exclusive homosexuality to exclusive heterosexuality. These groups, like those based in socially conservative Christianity, are aimed at attempting to guide homosexuals towards heterosexuality.
One of the leading LGBT reformatory Muslim organization is StraightWay Foundation, which was established in the United Kingdom in 2004 as an organization that provides information and advice for Muslims who struggle with homosexual attraction. They believe "that through following God's guidance", one may "cease to be" gay. They teach that the male-female pair is the "basis for humanity's growth" and that homosexual acts "are forbidden by God".  NARTH has written favourably of the group. In 2004, Straightway entered into a controversy with the contemporary Mayor of London, Ken Livingstone, and the controversial Islamic cleric Yusuf al-Qaradawi. It was suggested that Livingstone was giving a platform to Islamic fundamentalists, and not liberal and progressive Muslims. Straightway responded to this by sending Livingstone a letter thanking him for his support of al-Qaradawi.  Livingstone then ignited controversy when he thanked Straightway for the letter.

Attempts against LGBT people 
Several anti-LGBT incidents have occurred:
 In 2012, in the English city of Derby, some Muslim men "distributed . . . leaflets depicting gay men being executed in an attempt to encourage hatred against homosexuals." The leaflets had such titles as "Turn or Burn" and "God abhors you" and they advocated a death penalty for homosexuality. The men were "convicted of hate crimes" on 20 January 2012. One of the men said that he was doing his Muslim duty.
 31 December 2013 – New Year's Eve arson attack on gay nightclub in Seattle, packed with 300+ revelers, but no one injured. Subject charged prosecuted under federal terror and hate-crime charges.
 12 February 2016 – Across Europe, gay refugees facing abuse at migrant asylum shelters are forced to flee shelters.
 25 April 2016 – Xulhaz Mannan, an employee of the United States embassy in Dhaka and the editor of Bangladesh's first and only LGBT magazine, was killed in his apartment by a gang of Islamic militants.
 12 June 2016 – At least 49 people were killed and 50 injured in a mass shooting at Pulse gay nightclub in Orlando, Florida, in the second deadliest mass shooting by an individual and the deadliest incident of violence against LGBT people in U.S. history. The shooter, Omar Mateen, pledged allegiance to ISIL. The act has been described by investigators as an Islamic terrorist attack and a hate crime. Upon further review, investigators indicated Omar Mateen showed few signs of radicalization, suggesting that the shooter's pledge to ISIL may have been a calculated move to garner more news coverage. Muslim American and their community leaders swiftly condemned the attack, and prayer vigils for the victims were held at mosques across the country. The Florida mosque where Mateen sometimes prayed issued a statement condemning the attack and offering condolences to the victims. The Council on American–Islamic Relations called the attack "monstrous" and offered its condolences to the victims. CAIR Florida urged Muslims to donate blood and contribute funds in support of the victims' families.
 During March 2019, British Muslim parents began protesting Parkfield Community School, a town where more than a third of the children are Muslim, due to the school's implementation of a “No Outsiders” sex-education program. The aim of this program was to provide students with lessons on same-sex relationships. The protest led to the school backing down by no longer following through with the “No Outsider” program. Regardless of this, the school's minister emphasized that the school tries to express equality.

Liberal and progressive movements

The coming together of "human rights discourses and sexual orientation struggles" has resulted in an abundance of "social movements and organizations concerned with gender and sexual minority oppression and discrimination." Today, most LGBTQ-affirming Islamic organizations and individual congregations are primarily based in the Western world and South Asian countries; they usually identify themselves with the liberal and progressive movements within Islam.

In France there was an Islamic same-sex marriage on February 18, 2012. In Paris in November 2012 a room in a Buddhist prayer hall was used by gay Muslims and called a "gay-friendly mosque", and a French Islamic website is supporting religious same-sex marriage. The Ibn Ruschd-Goethe mosque in Berlin is a liberal mosque open to all types of Muslims, where men and women pray together and LGBT worshippers are welcomed and supported. Other significant LGBT-inclusive mosques or prayer groups include the El-Tawhid Juma Circle Unity Mosque in Toronto, Masjid an-Nur al-Isslaah (Light of Reform Mosque) in Washington D.C., Masjid Al-Rabia in Chicago, Unity Mosque in Atlanta, People's Mosque in Cape Town South Africa, Masjid Ul-Umam mosque in Cape Town, Qal'bu Maryamin in California, and the Nur Ashki Jerrahi Sufi Community in New York City.

Muslims for Progressive Values, based in the United States and Malaysia, is "a faith-based, grassroots, human rights organization that embodies and advocates for the traditional Qur'anic values of social justice and equality for all, for the 21st Century." The Mecca Institute is an LGBT-inclusive and progressive online Islamic seminary, and serves as an online center of Islamic learning and research.

Defunct movements

The Al-Fatiha Foundation was an organization which tried to advance the cause of gay, lesbian, and transgender Muslims. It was founded in 1998 by Faisal Alam, a Pakistani American, and was registered as a nonprofit organization in the United States. The organization was an offshoot of an internet listserve that brought together many gay, lesbian and questioning Muslims from various countries.

In 2001, Al-Muhajiroun, an international organization which sought the establishment of a global Islamic caliphate, but which is now a banned and defunct, issued a fatwa (ruling) declaring that all members of Al-Fatiha were murtadd (apostates), and condemning them to death. Because of this threat and their conservative familial backgrounds, many Al-Fatiha members chose anonymity to protect their identity. Al-Fatiha had fourteen chapters in the United States, as well as offices in Great Britain, Canada, Spain, Turkey, and South Africa.

Active movements
The Al-Fitrah Foundation,  previously known as The Inner Circle was one of the first queer Muslim organizations founded in 1996 when its founder Imam Muhsin Hendricks publicly revealed his sexual orientation.  Imam Muhsin Hendricks is also considered as the world's first openly queer Imam.  His activism grew since then and the organization became public in 1998.  It soon grew into an international organization with annual international retreats of up to 120 international delegates meeting annually in Cape Town to discuss issues pertaining to LGBTIQ Muslims.  In 2018 after having served the organization for 20 years her resigned after detecting corruption in the organization and being maliciously and wrongfully accused of mismanagement of funds.  He, along with other queer Muslims who left the old Al-Fitrah Foundation founded a new organization in 2018 called Al-Ghurbaah Foundation. Imam Muhsin Hendricks also administers the Compassion-centred Islamic Network (CCI Network) which is a global network that seeks to connect and create a stronger voice for queer Muslims amongst activists, academics, Islamic scholars and religious leaders (Imams).  Currently, the organization's main focus is working with religious leaders (Imams) while serving the needs of the queer Muslim community globally.  Al-Ghurbaah Foundation also runs an inclusive mosque called Masjidul Ghurbaah which is open to anyone who wants to connect spiritually regardless of sexual orientation, gender identity, religion or belief.
 In November 2012, a prayer room was set up in Paris by gay Islamic scholar and founder of the group 'Homosexual Muslims of France' Ludovic-Mohamed Zahed. It was described by the press as the first gay-friendly mosque in Europe. The reaction from the rest of the Muslim community in France has been mixed. The opening has been condemned by the Grand Mosque of Paris.

 In September 2019, a group of Muslims known as Imaan who identify and support LGBTQ+ members of Islam religion attempted to crowdfund £5,000 to host a festival for LGBTQ+ Muslims. Since homosexuality is against the law in some Middle Eastern countries, Imaan is taking a large stance against these laws and is attempting to change the way Middle Eastern countries look at LGBTQ+ individuals. Many LGBTQ+ Muslims are forced to choose between their sexuality and their religion, often forcing individuals to not express who they truly are.
 The Ibn Ruschd-Goethe mosque in Berlin is a liberal mosque open to all types of Muslims, where men and women pray together and LGBT worshippers are welcomed and supported.
 Nur Warsame has been an advocate for LGBTQ Muslims. He founded Marhaba, a support group for queer Muslims in Melbourne, Australia. In May 2016, Wahrsage revealed that he is homosexual in an interview on SBS2's The Feed, being the first openly gay Imam in Australia.
 The Muslim Alliance for Sexual and Gender Diversity (MASGD) in the United States began on 23 January 2013. On 20 June 2016, an interview with Mirna Haidar (a member of the MASGD's steering committee) was published in The Washington Post. She described the MASGD as supporting "LGBT Muslims who want or need to embrace both their sexual and religious identities." Haidar said that the support which the MASGD provides is needed because a person who is "Muslim and queer " faces "two different systems of oppression": Islamophobia and homophobia.
 Muslims for Progressive Values, based in the United States and in Malaysia, is "a faith-based, grassroots, human rights organization that embodies and advocates for the traditional Qur'anic values of social justice and equality for all, for the 21st Century."
 The Safra Project for women is based in the UK. It supports and works on issues relating to prejudice LGBTQ Muslim women. It was founded in October 2001 by Muslim LBT women. The Safra Project's "ethos is one of inclusiveness and diversity."

 Salaam is the first gay Muslim group in Canada and second in the world. Salaam was found in 1993 by El-Farouk Khaki, who organized the Salaam/Al-Fateha International Conference in 2003.
 Sarajevo Open Centre, abbreviated SOC, is an independent feminist civil society organization and advocacy group which campaigns for lesbian, gay, bisexual, trans and intersex (LGBTI) people and women rights in Bosnia and Herzegovina. The organization also gives asylum and psychological support to victims of discrimination and violence.
 The Pink Report is an annual report made by the organization on the state of the Human Rights of LGBTI People in the country and is supported by the Norwegian Embassy.
 In May 2009, the Toronto Unity Mosque / el-Tawhid Juma Circle was founded by Laury Silvers, a University of Toronto religious studies scholar, alongside Muslim gay-rights activists El-Farouk Khaki and Troy Jackson. Unity Mosque/ETJC is a gender-equal, LGBT+ affirming, mosque. The mosque offers aims to eliminate gender segregation by removing a dress code for women. While it was the only mosques of its kind when it first opened, more communities and mosques have become more accepting of LGBT members. El-Farouk Khaki has been quoted as saying “more and more groups, communities and mosques that celebrate and embrace inclusion and diversity are forming”.
 Imam Daayiee Abdullah, one of America's first openly gay Imams, argues that the existing view towards homosexuality among Muslims is based on tradition, not an interpretation of scriptures. In 2011, Abdullah created an LGBTQ+ mosques, known as the Light of Reform Mosque, to provide members of the LGBTQ+ community with marriage ceremonies. Abdullah opened the Mecca Institute in an attempt to open at least 50 LGBTQ+ friendly mosques by 2030.

Muslim LGBT rights activists

There are numbers of Muslim LGBT activists from different parts of the world. Some of them are listed below:
 Nemat Sadat, Afghan-American journalist, novelist, human rights and LGBTQIA+ rights activist, former professor of political science at the American University of Afghanistan.
 Afdhere Jama, Somali-American Queer Muslim editor of Huriyah.
 El-Farouk Khaki, Tanzanian-born Canadian lawyer and founder of Salaam, the first homosexual Muslim group in Canada.
 Faisal Alam, Pakistani-American founder of Al-Fatiha Foundation.
 Irshad Manji, Canadian lesbian and human rights activist of Egyptian descent.
 Maryam Hatoon Molkara, Iranian campaigner for transsexual rights in Iran.
 Parvez Sharma, Indian-American filmmaker and LGBT rights activist.
 Ahmad Zahra, first openly LGBTI Muslim elected to public office in the United States.
 Daayiee Abdullah, African-American gay imam from the United States.
 Ludovic-Mohamed Zahed, Algerian-French gay imam from Algeria.
 Amal Aden, Somali-Norwegian author, lecturer, and lesbian rights activist.
 Waheed Alli, Baron Alli, British media entrepreneur and a member of the House of Lords in the United Kingdom, sitting as a life peer for the Labour Party.
 Sumaya Dalmar, also known as Sumaya YSL, is a Somali-Canadian transgender activist and model.
 Blair Imani, African-American gay rights activist.
 Florina Kaja, American reality television personality, singer, actress, and activist.
 Saleem Kidwai, medieval historian, gay rights activist, and translator.
 Tynan Power, progressive Muslim faith leader, writer/editor, communications specialist, activist, and educator.
 Ahmad Danny Ramadan, Syrian-Canadian novelist, public speaker, columnist, and gay refugee activist.
 Omar Sharif Jr., Egyptian-Canadian actor, model, and gay rights activist.
 Hamed Sinno, Lebanese singer, songwriter, and musician.
 Samra Habib, Queer Muslim photographer.
 Sarah Hegazi, Egyptian socialist and lesbian rights activist.

In popular culture

Books

Islam and Homosexuality
In 2010, an anthology Islam and Homosexuality was published. In the Forward, Parvez Sharma sounded a pessimistic note about the future: "In my lifetime I do not see Islam drafting a uniform edict that homosexuality is permissible." Following is material from two chapters dealing with the present:

Rusmir Musić in a chapter "Queer Visions of Islam" said that "Queer Muslims struggle daily to reconcile their sexuality and their faith." Musić began to study in college "whether or not my love for somebody of the same gender disgusts God and whether it will propel me to hell. The answer, for me, is an unequivocal no. Furthermore, Musić wrote, "my research and reflection helped me to imagine my sexuality as a gift from a loving, not hateful, God."

Marhuq Fatima Khan in a chapter "Queer, American, and Muslim: Cultivating Identities and Communities of Affirmation," says that "Queer Muslims employ a few narratives to enable them to reconcile their religious and sexual identities." They "fall into three broad categories: (1) God Is Merciful; (2) That Is Just Who I Am; and (3) It's Not Just Islam."

Progressive Muslims: On Justice, Gender, and Pluralism
In his 2003 book Progressive Muslims: On Justice, Gender, and Pluralism, Professor Scott Siraj al-Haqq Kugle asserts "that Islam does not address homosexuality." In Kugle's reading, the Quran holds "a positive assessment of diversity." It "respects diversity in physical appearance, constitution, stature, and color of human beings as a natural consequence of Divine wisdom in creation." Therefore, Islam can be described as "a religion that positively assesses diversity in creation and in human societies." Furthermore, in Kugle's reading, the Quran "implies that some people are different in their sexual desires than others." Thus, homosexuality can be seen as part of the "natural diversity in sexuality in human societies." This is the way "gay and lesbian Muslims" view their homosexuality.

In addition to the Qur'an, Kugle refers to the benediction of Imam Al-Ghazali (the 11th-century Muslim theologian) which says "praise be to God, the marvels of whose creation are not subject to the arrows of accident." For Kugle, this benediction implies that "if sexuality is inherent in a person's personality, then sexual diversity is a part of creation, which is never accidental but is always marvelous." Kugle also refers to "a rich archive of same-sex sexual desires and expressions, written by or reported about respected members of society: literati, educated elites, and religious scholars." Given these writings, Kugle concludes that "one might consider Islamic societies (like classical Greece) to provide a vivid illustration of a 'homosexual-friendly' environment." This evoked from "medieval and early modern Christian Europeans" accusations that Muslim were "engaging openly in same-sex practices."

Kugle goes a step further in his argument and asserts that "if some Muslims find it necessary to deny that sexual diversity is part of the natural created world, then the burden of proof rests on their shoulders to illustrate their denial from the Qur'anic discourse itself."

Sexual Ethics and Islam
Kecia Ali in her 2016 book Sexual Ethics and Islam says that "there is no one Muslim perspective on anything." Regarding the Quran, Ali says that modern scholars disagree about what it says about "same-sex intimacy." Some scholars argue that "the Qur'an does not address homosexuality or homosexuals explicitly."

Regarding homosexuality, Ali says the belief that "exclusively homosexual desire is innate in some individuals" has been adopted "even among some relatively conservative Western Muslim thinkers." 100 Homosexual Muslims believe their homosexuality to be innate and view "their sexual orientation as God-given and immutable." She observes that "queer and trans people are sometimes treated as defective or deviant," and adds that it is "vital not to assume that variation implies imperfection or disability."

Regarding "medieval Muslim culture," Ali says that "male desire to penetrate desirable youth . . . was perfectly normal." Ali states that some scholars claim that Islamic societies were 'homosexual-friendly' in history.

In her article "Same-sex Sexual Activity and Lesbian and Bisexual Women", Ali elaborates on homosexuality as an aspect of medieval Muslim culture. She says that "same-sex sexual expression has been a more or less recognized aspect of Muslim societies for many centuries." There are many explicit discussions of "same-sex sexual activity" in medieval Arabic literature. Ali states there is a lack of focus in medieval tradition on female same-sex sexual activity, where the Qur'an mainly focuses male/male sex. With female same-sex sexual activity there is more focus on the punishment for the acts and the complications with the dower, compared to men where there is a focus on punishment but also the need for ablutions and the effect of the act on possible marriage decisions.

Miscellaneous
 Islamic Homosexualities: Culture, History, and Literature (1997) —  essay collection
 In February 2019, the government of Indonesia – a country with a majority Muslim population – threatened to ban Instagram due to an account that was posting “Gay Muslim” comics. @Alpantuni was a profile that posted comics that tackled gay-identity and religious bigotry to connect with members of the LGBT community. Although Instagram refused to remove the account as it would violate its own terms and conditions, the account is currently unavailable.

Films and media
 In 2007, the documentary film A Jihad for Love was released. It was produced by Sandi Simcha DuBowski and directed by Parvez Sharma. As of 2016 the film has been shown in 49 nations to four million plus viewers.
 Out in the Dark is a 2012 film about the gay love story of a Palestinian Muslim and an Israeli Jew.
 Breaking Fast is a love story between Mo, a gay Muslim doctor in Los Angeles and Kal who get to know each other over nightly iftars.
 In 2015, the documentary film A Sinner in Mecca was released. It was directed by Parvez Sharma. The film chronicles Sharma's Hajj pilgrimage to Mecca, Saudi Arabia as an openly gay Muslim. The film premiered at the 2015 Hot Docs Canadian International Documentary Festival to great critical acclaim. The film opened in theaters in the US on 4 September 2015 and is a New York Times Critics' Pick.
 In 2015's How Gay is Pakistan? Mawaan Rizwan traveled to Pakistan, his country of birth, to film a documentary which explored the issues faced by other LGBTQ Muslims living under Islamic law that deems homosexuality illegal. The documentary was televised internationally, including on ABC2 in Australia, CBC in Canada and in various markets via Amazon Prime Video.
 In 2016, Vice News released a short documentary Blackout: Being LGBT in the Islamic Republic of Pakistan in which they showed different members of the LGBT community in Lahore. Young men who are sex workers were shown in the video and they explained the difficulties of being gay in Pakistan. The documentary also focused on some underground organisations that work for basic human rights for the LGBT community. In the film, there is a short clip shown of a young boy getting beaten up and is later sodomised with a tree branch after he was caught in homosexual acts by conservative religious society members. It also displayed how gay and transgender people use social media apps like Tinder to get in contact with other people of the community. However, this documentary, made in collaboration with Google's technology incubator Jigsaw, has been criticised by some for its sensational approach and blatantly showcasing Google's agenda of juxtaposing empowerment through digital technologies such as Tinder and the collective backwardness and oppression as shown through the blurred video of the young boy being beaten.
 Gay Muslims is a six-part documentary on Channel 4 about the LGBT among Muslims, broadcast in the UK in January.
 The Muslim Debate Initiative (MDI) is made up of Muslims "with experience in public speaking, apologetics, polemics, research and community work." One of its aims is "to support, encourage and promote debate that contrasts Islam against other intellectual and political discourses for the purpose of the pursuit of truth, intellectual scrutiny with respect, and the clarifying accurate understandings of other worldviews between people of different cultures, beliefs and political persuasions."

Terminology
 Bacha bazi — Afghan slang term (lit. "boy play")
 Hijra – South Asian transgender society
 Khanith – A term for Arab "effeminate" men
 Khawal – Egyptian cross-dressed male dancers (often used as an anti-gay slur)

See also

 Gender roles in Islam
 Islam and gender segregation
 Islamic sexual jurisprudence
 LGBT in the Middle East
 LGBT in the Ottoman Empire
 Inclusive Mosque Initiative

References

Notes

Citations

Sources

 
 
 
 
  Georg Klauda: Die Vertreibung aus dem Serail. Europa und die Heteronormierung der islamischen Welt. Männerschwarm Verlag, Hamburg 2008, . See pages at  Google Books.
 
 
 
 
 Duran, Khalid. Homosexuality in Islam, in: Swidler, Anne (ed.) "Homosexuality and World Religions" (1993). Trinity Press International, Valley Forge, Pennsylvania. 
 Kilgerman, Nicole (2007). Homosexuality in Islam: A Difficult Paradox. Macalester Islam Journal 2(3):52–64, Berkeley Electronic press.
 Khaled El-Rouayheb, Before Homosexuality in the Arab–Islamic World, 1500–1800 Chicago, 2009. .
 Luongo, Michael (ed.), Gay Travels in the Muslim World Haworth Press, 2007. .
 
 Everett K. Rowson, J.W. Wright (eds.), Homoeroticism in Classical Arabic Literature New York, 1997
 Arno Schmitt and Jehoeda Sofer (eds.), Sexuality and Eroticism Among Males in Moslem Societies Harrington Park Press 1992
 Arno Schmitt and Gianni de Martino, Kleine Schriften zu zwischenmännlicher Sexualität und Erotik in der muslimischen Gesellschaft, Berlin, Gustav-Müller-Str. 10 : A. Schmitt, 1985
 
 Wafer, Jim (1997) "Muhammad and Male Homosexuality" in "Islamic Homosexualities: culture, history, and literature" by Stephen O. Murray and Will Roscoe (eds.), NYU Press New York
 Wafer, Jim (1997) "The Symbolism of Male Love in Islamic Mysthical Literature" in "Islamic Homosexualities: culture, history, and literature" by Stephen O. Murray and Will Roscoe (eds.), NYU Press New York 1997
 Vincenzo Patanè, "Homosexuality in the Middle East and North Africa" in: Aldrich, Robert (ed.) Gay Life and Culture: A World History, Thames & Hudson, London, 2006
 [Pellat, Charles.] "Liwat". Encyclopedia of Islam. New edition. Vol. 5. Leiden: Brill, 1986. pp. 776–79.
 Richard C. Martin (ed.), Encyclopedia of Islam and the Muslim World (Macmillan Reference USA, 2003)
 The Huffington Post has eighteen article about LGBT Muslims at LGBT Muslims Articles 
 Cambridge Journal, Queer History: a tour of gender and identity through time and culture

External links

 LGBTQI Lecture Series – Muslims for Progressive Values lecture series on homophobia in Muslim communities
 BBC3 'Free Speech' 'Can you be Gay and Muslim?' Maajid Nawaz vs Abdullah al Andalusi – BBC3's "Gay and Muslim" debate between Maajid Nawaz and Abdullah al Andalusi
 
 

Discrimination against LGBT people
Islamic criminal jurisprudence
Islam-related controversies
 
LGBT-related controversies
Homosexuality, Islamic views of